The SEAT Arona is a subcompact crossover SUV (B-segment) manufactured by SEAT since 2017. It is the smallest crossover SUV offered by the Spanish brand. It slots in below the Ateca compact model and Tarraco seven-seater.

Overview 

SEAT launched three new utility vehicles between 2016 and 2019, due to the growing popularity of them. First was the middle one in size, the Ateca in 2016, next is the Arona, and the mid-size SUV is the Tarraco in 2018.

Before its reveal, SEAT's deputy chairman Ramón Paredes met with mayor of Arona, Tenerife, Spain. The Ibiza-based crossover was first presented in Barcelona on 26 June 2017. The car was shown to the public audience in the Frankfurt Motor Show for the first time in September 2017.

The Arona is based on the same platform as the current Ibiza, while the said platform also underpin various vehicles in manufactured by Volkswagen Group including the Volkswagen Polo, Volkswagen T-Cross, and Škoda Kamiq.

Powertrain 

In September 2018, a CNG version was introduced with a 1.0-litre TGI engine.

Safety
The Arona was awarded 5 stars by Euro NCAP in 2017.

The updated Spanish-made Arona in its most basic Latin American version received 5 stars for adults occupants and 5 for toddlers from Latin NCAP in 2018.

Gallery

Sales and production figures

References

Cars introduced in 2017
Cars of Spain
Crossover sport utility vehicles
Front-wheel-drive vehicles
Mini sport utility vehicles
Euro NCAP small off-road
Latin NCAP small off-road
Arona